The United States Intercollegiate Boxing Association (USIBA) is a nonprofit amateur collegiate boxing league founded in 2012 and formed, in part, to address perceived safety and fairness issues present in the National Collegiate Boxing Association (such as matching up boxers with significant skill or experience disparities), and to generally organize the sport at a collegiate level more adequately. The USIBA was also the first organization to hold national collegiate-level women's boxing championships in the United States (the subject of which had been another point of contention with the NCBA), beginning with their inaugural national tournament in 2013.

The association is an affiliate of USA Boxing.

Participating schools 
Current schools:
 Alverno College
 Cornell University
 Georgetown University
 Georgia State University
 Georgia Tech
 University of Kansas
 Olivet College
 Syracuse University
 Texas A&M University
 The George Washington University
 Towson University
 UC Davis
 University of Illinois
 University of Maryland
 University of Miami
 University of Michigan
 University of San Francisco
 The University of Texas Rio Grande Valley (UTRGV)
 University of Wisconsin
 Virginia Military Institute
 Wake Forest University
 Western State Colorado University
 Washington and Lee University

Former schools:
 UCLA (joined the NCBA after the 2015 season)
 United States Military Academy (women's team only; joined the NCBA after the 2015 season)

Weight Classes 

The USIBA closely follows the weight classes prescribed by USA Boxing, though does not name the classes, instead referring to them only by the weight itself. Not all weight classes are necessarily contested at each national tournament.

National Tournament
In the national tournament, boxers are divided into three classes: Beginner (0-2 sanctioned bouts), Novice (0-9 bouts), and Elite (5+ bouts), as per USA Boxing rules. The experience division plays into the final team scoring system, in which more experienced boxers earn more points for their team. This structure also allows for the possibility of, for example, a boxer winning a Beginner championship and then competing for a Novice title later in the tournament, usually on the final day.

Team scoring
Quarterfinal wins: 
 Beginners earn 1 point for their team
 Novices earn 2 points for their team
 Elites earn 3 points for their team

Semifinal wins:
 Beginners earn 2 point for their team
 Novices earn 3 points for their team
 Elites earn 4 points for their team

Championship wins:
 Beginners earn 3 point for their team
 Novices earn 4 points for their team
 Elites earn 5 points for their team

National Team Champions

Champions are as follows:

See also
College club sports in the United States
Collegiate Nationals
NCAA Boxing Championship
National Collegiate Boxing Association

References

External links 
 

Amateur boxing organizations
College boxing in the United States
College sports governing bodies in the United States